Of around 155 extant Sanskrit plays, at least 46 distinct plays by at least 24 authors have been translated into English. William Jones published the first English translation of any Sanskrit play (Shakuntala) in 1789. About 3 decades later, Horace Hayman Wilson published the first major English survey of Sanskrit drama, including 6 full translations (Mṛcchakatika, Vikramōrvaśīyam, Uttararamacarita, Malatimadhava, Mudrarakshasa, and Ratnavali). These 7 plays — plus Nagananda, Mālavikāgnimitram, and Svapnavasavadattam (the text of which was not discovered until almost a century after Wilson's volumes) — remain the most-translated plays.

The period of Sanskrit dramas in India begins roughly with the composition of the Natya Shastra (c. 200 BCE – 200 CE) — though this treatise evidences a mature theatrical practice already in existence. Literarily, the period dwindles around the composition of the Natya Shatra's influential abridgment: Dasharupakam (late 10th century CE) — though derivative works continued to be written. "Sanskrit drama" typically contains a mix of Sanskrit and Prakrit though, for example, Bhāsa's Dūtavākya contains no Prakrit, and Rajashekhara's Karpuramanjari is written entirely in Prakrit.

List of translations

Key

 Published as — The titles of the English translations, with links to their full bibliographic entries.
 Year — The year of the translation's first publication. However, revised editions are frequently cited in the bibliography.

Fragmentary passages are not considered here, nor are modern dramas written in Sanskrit.

Table

Notes and references

Notes

References

Bibliography

Translations

Anonymous

Bāṇabhaṭṭa

Baudhāyana

Bhāsa

Bhaṭṭa Nārāyaṇa

Bhavabhūti

Diṇnāga

Harihara

Harsha

Jayanta Bhatta

Kālidāsa

Krsna Misra

Mahendravarman

Murāri

Rajashekhara

Sakthibhadran

Subhata

Shudraka

Śyāmilaka

Umāpati Upādhyāya

Vararuchi

Vedanta Desika

Vishakhadatta

Multiple authors

Other references
 
 
 

 
Translations into English
Lists of plays
Translation-related lists